New York's 143rd State Assembly district is one of the 150 districts in the New York State Assembly. It has been represented by Monica Wallace since 2017.

Geography
District 143 is located entirely within Erie County. It contains towns east of Buffalo, such as Cheektowaga, Lancaster, Depew and Sloan. Buffalo Niagara International Airport is located in this district.

Recent election results

2020

2018

2016

2014

2012

2010

References

143
Erie County, New York